The Chenango River is a  tributary of the Susquehanna River in central New York in the United States. It drains a dissected plateau area in upstate New York at the northern end of the Susquehanna watershed.
 
Named after the Oneida word for bull thistle,  in the 19th century the Chenango furnished a critical link in the canal system of the northeastern United States. The Chenango Canal, built from 1836–1837 between Utica and Binghamton, connected the Erie Canal in the north to the Susquehanna River. The canal was rendered obsolete by railroads and was abandoned in 1878.

Flooding is often a concern during the spring and fall.

Course

The Chenango River begins near Morrisville in Madison County, in central New York, in the Morrisville Swamp in the Town of Smithfield, about 25 miles southwest of Utica.  The river flows from the Campbell Lakes in the swamp, from waters flowing in from the Smithfield Hills to the north and west and a series of cliffs called "The Ledges" to the north and east. It flows south-southeast through the swamp.  From Morrisville, it flows south past Eaton and is paralleled by the remnants of the old Chenango Canal from Randallsville, just south of Hamilton, to just north of Earlville where the old canal joined the river. Continuing south the Chenango is joined by the Sangerfield River, also known as the East Branch of the Chenango, just south of Earlville. Then it flows south past Sherburne to Norwich, where it turns southwest.  At Oxford it turns south, and at Warn Lake it again turns southwest.  It flows past Brisben and Greene to Chenango Forks, where, about nine miles north of Binghamton, it receives from the right its major tributary, the Tioughnioga River. It ends where it joins the Susquehanna from the north in downtown Binghamton in Broome County.  Its overall length is about 90 miles.

Tributaries

Right
Callahan Brook
Electric Light Stream
Eaton Brook
Bradley Brook
Kingsley Brook
Stone Mill Brook
Cold Spring Brook
Fly Creek
Cold Brook
Canasawacta Creek
Gilmore Brook
Fly Meadow Creek
Mill Brook
Bowman Creek,
Tillotson Creek
Spring Brook
Genegantslet Creek
Ockerman Brook
Tioughnioga River
Thomas Creek
Castle Creek
Cutler Creek

Left
 Payne Brook
 Sangerfield River 
Mad Brook 
West Brook
Whapanaka Brook
 Thompson Creek
Ransford Creek
Glen Road Brook
Wheeler Brook
 Page Brook Creek
Osborne Creek
Phelps Creek

See also
List of New York rivers

Notes

Rivers of New York (state)
Rivers of Broome County, New York
Rivers of Madison County, New York
Rivers of Chenango County, New York
Tributaries of the Susquehanna River